Doľany may refer to:

 Doľany, Levoča District, Slovakia
 Doľany, Pezinok District, Slovakia